Stylocheiron is a genus of krill, containing the following species:
Stylocheiron abbreviatum G. O. Sars, 1883
Stylocheiron affine Hansen, 1910
Stylocheiron armatum Colosi, 1917
Stylocheiron carinatum G. O. Sars, 1883
Stylocheiron elongatum G. O. Sars, 1883
Stylocheiron indicum Silas & Mathew, 1967
Stylocheiron insulare Hansen, 1910
Stylocheiron longicorne G. O. Sars, 1883
Stylocheiron maximum Hansen, 1908
Stylocheiron microphthalma Hansen, 1910
Stylocheiron robustum Brinton, 1962
Stylocheiron suhmi G. O. Sars, 1883

References

Krill
Crustacean genera
Taxa named by Georg Ossian Sars